In mountaineering, the death zone refers to altitudes above a certain point where the pressure of oxygen is insufficient to sustain human life for an extended time span. The concept was conceived in 1953 by Edouard Wyss-Dunant, a Swiss doctor, who called it the lethal zone. All 14 peaks above 8000 m in the death zone are located in the Himalaya and Karakoram of Asia.

Many deaths in high-altitude mountaineering have been caused by the effects of the death zone, either directly by loss of vital functions or indirectly by wrong decisions made under stress, or physical weakening leading to accidents. An extended stay above  without supplementary oxygen will result in deterioration of bodily functions and death.

Physiological background 
The human body has optimal endurance below  elevation. In healthy
individuals, this saturates hemoglobin, the oxygen-binding red pigment in red blood cells.

When PO2 drops, the body responds with altitude acclimatization. Additional red blood cells are manufactured; the heart beats faster; non-essential body functions are suppressed, food digestion efficiency declines (as the body suppresses the digestive system in favor of increasing its cardiopulmonary reserves); and one breathes more deeply and more frequently. But acclimatization requires days or even weeks. Failure to acclimatize may result in altitude sickness, including high-altitude pulmonary edema (HAPE) or cerebral edema (HACE).

Humans have survived for 2 years at  [ of atmospheric pressure], which appears to be near the limit of the permanently tolerable highest altitude. At extreme altitudes, above  [ of atmospheric pressure], sleeping becomes very difficult, digesting food is near-impossible, and the risk of HAPE or HACE increases greatly.

In the death zone and higher, no human body can acclimatize. The body uses up its store of oxygen faster than it can be replenished.  An extended stay in the zone without supplementary oxygen will result in deterioration of body functions, loss of consciousness and, ultimately, death. Scientists at the High Altitude Pathology Institute in Bolivia dispute the existence of a death zone, based on observation of extreme tolerance to hypoxia in patients with chronic mountain sickness and normal fetuses in-utero, both of which present pO2 levels similar to those at the summit of Mount Everest.

Mountaineers use supplemental oxygen in the death zone to reduce deleterious effects. An open-circuit oxygen apparatus was first tested on the 1922 and 1924 British Mount Everest expeditions; the bottled oxygen taken in 1921 was not used (see George Finch and Noel Odell).  In 1953 the first assault party of Tom Bourdillon and Charles Evans used closed-circuit oxygen apparatus. The second (successful) party of Ed Hillary and Tenzing Norgay used open-circuit oxygen apparatus; after ten minutes taking photographs on the summit without his oxygen set on, Hillary said he "was becoming rather clumsy-fingered and slow-moving". 

Physiologist Griffith Pugh was on the 1952 and 1953 expeditions to study the effects of cold and altitude; he recommended acclimatising above  for at least 36 days and the use of closed-circuit equipment. He further studied the ability to acclimatise over several months on the 1960-61 Silver Hut expedition to the Himalayas. 

In 1978, Reinhold Messner and Peter Habeler made the first ascent of Mount Everest without supplemental oxygen.

See also
1996 Everest disaster
2008 K2 disaster
Effects of high altitude on humans
Hypoxemia
Hypoxia (medical)

References 

Mountaineering
Eight-thousanders
Human physiology

de:Höhenbergsteigen#Todeszone